"Still D.R.E." is a song by American rapper-producer Dr. Dre, featuring fellow American rapper Snoop Dogg. It was released on November 2, 1999, as the lead single from Dre's multi-platinum second studio album, 2001 (1999).

Anchored by a memorable staccato keyboard vamp, the single was popular, helping the album reach multi-platinum status and announcing Dre's return to the forefront of the hip-hop scene. "Still D.R.E." debuted and peaked at number 93 on the Billboard Hot 100 in 1999 before re-entering and peaking at number 23 in 2022. It was more successful in the United Kingdom, where it reached number 6.  The song has been performed live numerous times by both Dr. Dre and Snoop Dogg. Notable performances include the 2000 Up in Smoke Tour and as the final song in the Super Bowl LVI halftime show on February 13, 2022, alongside fellow American rappers Eminem, Mary J. Blige, Kendrick Lamar, 50 Cent. and Anderson .Paak, with the latter on drums.

Background
Dr. Dre released his highly acclaimed debut solo album The Chronic in 1992. After this, Dre went seven years without releasing an album. During this time he featured on the Billboard Hot 100 chart-toppers "California Love" and "No Diggity", while also producing Snoop Dogg and Eminem's debut studio albums Doggystyle and The Slim Shady LP, respectively. The stakes were higher for the sequel to The Chronic, so Dre recruited Jay-Z to ghostwrite lyrics for the former's comeback single, "Still D.R.E.". "At first, he wrote about diamonds and Bentleys," Dre told Blaze magazine in 1999. "So I told Jay to write some other shit. Jigga sat for 20 minutes and came back with some hard-ass, around-the-way L.A. shit." In an interview on The Breakfast Club, Snoop Dogg elaborated on Jay-Z's contributions on the song. "He wrote Dre’s shit and my shit and it was flawless," he said. "It was 'Still D.R.E.' and it was Jay-Z and he wrote the whole fucking song."

Music video
The music video, directed by Hype Williams, consists mainly of The D.O.C., Snoop Dogg and Dr. Dre driving and riding in lowrider cars (a reference to the "Nuthin' but a 'G' Thang" music video from The Chronic album). It features several cameos: Eminem chasing a group of women across a beach, Xzibit driving a lowrider, Funkmaster Flex with Dr. Dre, and Warren G riding with several women. In the background the individual throwing up the W with the crowd next to Snoop Dogg and Dr. Dre right next to the lowrider car was Coldhard from the Chicago-based rap group Crucial Conflict. The music video was released for the week ending on October 3, 1999. The video performance was officially uploaded via VEVO to Dr. Dre YouTube Channel on 27 October 2011.

Track listing
UK CD single #1

UK CD single #2

12-inch vinyl

Charts

Certifications

References

External links
 

1999 songs
1999 singles
Dr. Dre songs
Snoop Dogg songs
Gangsta rap songs
Songs written by Jay-Z
Songs written by Dr. Dre
Interscope Records singles
Songs written by Scott Storch
Aftermath Entertainment singles
Song recordings produced by Dr. Dre
Music videos directed by Hype Williams